OSUNY (Ohio Scientific Users of New York) was a dial-up bulletin board that was run by two different sysops in the 1980s, "Sysop" while in Scarsdale, New York, and Frank Roberts in White Plains, New York. Named for the Ohio Scientific computer it originally ran on, it attracted a large group of hackers, phone phreaks, engineers, computer programmers, and other technophiles. It remained a haven almost exclusively for the hacker/phreaker community until gaining notoriety through mention in a Newsweek article, Hacking Through NASA: A threat- or only an embarrassment, and mention in the book The Hacker Crackdown as a favored hangout of the notorious hacker group The Legion of Doom, after which it was shuttered, and another board was brought up as a "replacement" known as The Crystal Palace, which was short-lived.  OSUNY was restarted soon after, using an Altos 5-15D running MP/M and the continuously evolving Citadel/UX software. Also in the mid-1980s it became the first BBS to be associated with 2600 Magazine. It ran via dial-up until its closing around 1988.

Internet revival

In April 1997, the osuny.com domain name was registered with intentions of reincarnating the board on the Internet. This new OSUNY became accessible via interactive telnet and ssh login at the hostname saturn.osuny.com. It ran on the Linux operating system and Citadel/UX conferencing software. As with its previous incarnations, OSUNY attracted a loyal group of users, in spite of only being sporadically available. Saturn eventually disappeared, much to the disappointment of its regular users, and has been offline since late 1999.

In November 2000, a new generation of technological enthusiasts and a number of people from the previous generation brought back the OSUNY name. Owing to changes in technology, this OSUNY would once again be accessible from the Internet rather than via dial-up modem. This new system became accessible via interactive ssh login under a generic Dynamic dns host name. Initially, it ran on the OpenBSD operating system and Citadel/UX conferencing software. It later migrated from Citadel/UX to BBS100, and finally to 9bbs running on the Plan 9 operating system.

External links
The osuny.bell-labs.co web site
Full text of The Hacker Crackdown, by Bruce Sterling
Interview with one of the sysops of the original OSUNY
Bulletin board systems